This article presents a list of administrative divisions of Ukraine sorted by their gross regional product (GRP). GRP is the regional counterpart of the national gross domestic product (GDP), the most comprehensive measure of national economic activity.

Crimea and Sevastopol excluded because they have no data and are fully controlled by Russia.

See also
 List of Ukrainian oblasts and territories by salary
 List of Ukrainian subdivisions by GDP per capita

References

GDP
Economy of Ukraine-related lists